Nenkovice is a municipality and village in Hodonín District in the South Moravian Region of the Czech Republic. It has about 500 inhabitants.

Notable people
Jano Köhler (1873–1941), painter; lived here
Blažena Holišová (1930–2011), actress

References

Villages in Hodonín District
Moravian Slovakia